Kalapatti is a neighborhood of Coimbatore city in Tamil Nadu, India. It is  located 17 km North-East direction, within the city limits. Now Kalapatti is merged with Corporation of Coimbatore. Because of an increase of information technology (IT) companies surrounding in and around Kalapatti like Peelamedu, HopeCollege, Saravanampatti there is a fast rapid improvement in this place. The Coimbatore International Airport is just about 7 km from Kalapatti.

Demographics
 India census, Kalapatti had a population of 22,089. Males constitute 50% of the population and females 50%. Kalapatti has an average literacy rate of 72%, higher than the national average of 59.5%: male literacy is 78%, and female literacy is 65%.  In Kalapatti, 9% of the population is under 6 years of age.

Agriculture 
Kalapatti had agriculture as its key business until the late 1980s. The cotton industry was also famous. The key crop was corn and vegetables like tomato, bringal and okra.

Kalapatti was the head place for the surrounding suburbs of Valiyampalayam, Vilankurichi, Veeriyampalayam, Kaikolapalayam and Mylampatti.

Commerce 

The start of Sharp industries in 1976 turned the key for its developments.  Later a lot of machining industries (lathes) and motor industries grew up.
Today some of the world class motor pumpset brands Sharp, Ventura, Fisher and Point originate from Kalapatti . Pioneers in electronics Indus Electronics India (P) Ltd is also from Kalappati. 
The Solar Water factory of Hykon Group companies, Hykon India Limited is located at Kalapatti. Kalapatti has the geographical advantage of in midway between two National highways, Avinashi road NH-47 and Sathy road NH-209.

The southern part of the suburb, which is closer to NH-47, had better development when compared to the other parts of the suburbs. The southern part of the suburb known as Nehru nagar is well known for the rapid growth in recent years (1998–2009).

IT Parks
 Global Tech Park
 SVB Tech Park

References

Neighbourhoods in Coimbatore